Sentul chicken is a chicken breed originated from Indonesia. It is first developed in Ciamis Regency, West Java. Sentul is a dual-purpose breed, to provide both meat and eggs. It is considered as having higher growth rate and immunity to diseases compared with other Indonesian breeds. It is estimated the hatchling of this breed could reach maturity in about 12 weeks.

References 

Ciamis Regency
Chicken breeds originating in Indonesia